Route 123 is a state highway running  in the U.S. state of Rhode Island. Its western terminus is at Route 116 in Lincoln, and its eastern terminus is at the Massachusetts border where it continues as Massachusetts Route 123.

Route description
Route 123 begins at an intersection with Route 116, the George Washington Highway, northeast of North Central State Airport in Lincoln.  Signed as heading eastbound, the route initially travels in a southwesterly direction, carrying the name Albion Road. Route 123 skirts the east side of the airport on a two-lane road, briefly crossing into Smithfield. Here, Route 123 meets an intersection with Jenckes Hill Road, which the route begins to follow eastward from the airport and back into Lincoln. The road passes through a heavily wooded suburban area, intersecting Route 246 and interchanging with Route 146 at Exit 5 directly after.

Route 123 then takes on the name of Breakneck Hill Road and winds around its namesake hill on a curvy alignment. After an intersection with East Butterfly Way, its name changes again to Great Road. This stretch of Route 123 is designated as the Great Road Historic District; while mostly residential, the road passes by an entrance to Lincoln Woods State Park before changing to Front Street and continuing into the Lonsdale section of Lincoln where it intersects with Route 126. At the far east side of town, the route intersects Route 122 on Lonsdale Avenue, and its name changes to John Street before it bridges the Blackstone River alongside the Blackstone River Greenway and crosses into the town of Cumberland.

Just across the Blackstone River, Route 123 splits into a one-way pair of Chambers Street westbound and John Street eastbound, entering the village of Valley Falls and intersecting Broad Street, onto which the route turns north.  The road bridges a railroad alignment within town before intersecting Dexter Street, where the road turns eastward once more and then intersects Route 114's High Street the next block over. Route 123 and Dexter Street continue east over a creek and exit the state, becoming Massachusetts Route 123, which continues eastward through eastern Massachusetts.

Major intersections

References

External links

2019 Highway Map, Rhode Island

123
Transportation in Providence County, Rhode Island